The Sanskrit Press and Depository was set up in 1807 by Baburam, who was a teacher at Hariram College, one of the primitive colleges in east Bengal . Later, Ishwar Chandra Vidyasagar and Madan Mohan Tarkalankar  with a loan of 600 rupees updated it with better machinery and work-environment .

History
Vidyasagar began the Sanskrit Press with a couple of safe publishing bets: an edition of Bharat Chandra Ray's Annadamangal Kavya, a popular epic, for which his copy-text was a rare manuscript owned by the Krishnanagar zamindars, and the Betal Panchabingshati (Twenty Five Tales from a Demon), a traditional collection of Indian folk tales. Madan Mohan Tarkalankar began in 1849 an illustrated series for children, Shishu Shiksha (A Child's Lessons), the third number of which was Vidyasagar's Bodhodoy (The Dawn of Understanding, 1850). With Bodhodoy began Vidyasagar's project to reform and modernise Bengali primary education, using the Sanskrit Press as a laboratory for his experiments.

In 1865 he produced one of the most successful Bengali primers ever, the Varna Parichaya (Bengali pronunciation Borno Porichoy). This book, whose title loosely translates as "Learning One's Letters" or "An Introduction to the Bengali Alphabet", is much more than a simple alphabet book, and contains short moralistic tales, aphorisms and epigrams which quickly became proverbial in 19th century Bengal. Its purpose was to displace the ubiquitous Shishubodhak, Ballobodh, Bornobodh, etc., popular textbooks written by many hands and comprising a bizarre mix of folktales, proverbs, rules for negating curses, shlokas from the Arthashastra, and other edifying fragments. These books were barely suitable for children and were more like grab-bags of useful knowledge for the average householder. Partly swayed by influences from the 19th century England, Bengal in the mid-19th century was busy inventing childhood as a category, a difficult business in a society where children were routinely married off before puberty. Vidyasagar provided the intellectual basis for constructing a pedagogy of the child mind in Bengal, and he backed it up on the one hand with actual publishing programmes, and on the other with his campaign for widow remarriage and the raising of the age of consent.

However, in later ages Vidyasagar's style of teaching and moral aphorisms began to be regarded as stuffy and old-fashioned; this was less Vidyasagar's fault than the failure of subsequent generations to update his legacy appropriately.

Impact
Another area in which Vidyasagar's experience as a printer gave him unique knowledge was in the reform of Bengali typography and printing. Vidyasagar reformed Bengali typography into an alphabet of twelve vowels and 40 consonants and grappled with the problem of "joined letters" which continues to plague typographers of Bengali in the digital age.

See also
 Sanskrit revival
 List of Sanskrit universities in India
 List of Sanskrit academic institutes outside India
 List of historic Sanskrit texts 
 List of Sanskrit Buddhist literature
 List of legendary creatures in Sanskrit Hindu mythology 
 List of Sanskrit poets
 Sanskrit Collegiate School, Kolkata
 Symbolic usage of Sanskrit
 Sanskrit Wikipedia

References

Sanskrit
Publishing organizations
Printing
Publishing in India
1847 establishments in British India
Organisations based in India